The Washington Park Velodrome is an open-air velodrome in Kenosha, Wisconsin. It is the longest operating 333 meter track in the United States. The track opened in 1927. During the 2016 season, the track was closed and completely rebuilt.

Gallery

References

External links 
Official Page

Team links 
Kenosha Velosport
Half Acre Cycling
Chicago Women's Elite
XXX Racing
Kenosha Kutters

Buildings and structures in Kenosha, Wisconsin
Cycling in Wisconsin
Sports venues in Wisconsin
Tourist attractions in Kenosha County, Wisconsin
Velodromes in the United States